Adam-Charles-Gustave Desmazures (1818–1891), also known as Abbé Desmazures, was an author and Catholic priest, active in Montreal, Quebec, Canada.

Desmazures arrived in Montreal in 1851, where he became vicar of Notre-Dame de Montréal Basilica and of Saint-Jacques, and helped organize a reading group. He was later priest of St. Sulpice.

Selected works 
 Souvenirs de la Terre-Sainte : Moueurs et usages des tribes arabes nomades de la Syrie au temps présent, Paris : imprim. de Pillet aîné, 1845.
 Le Canada en 1868, Paris : E. Belin, [1868?].
 Eglise de St-François d'Assise, Montréal : Institut des artisans, 1870.
 Entretien sur les arts industriels, Montréal : Institut des artisans, 1870.
 Souvenirs de la persévérance de Montréal, Montréal : [s.n.], 1872.
 Explication des peintures de la chapelle Nazareth, Montréal : Eusèbe Senécal, imprimeur-éditeur, [1872?].
 M. Faillon, prêtre de St. Sulpice : sa vie et ses oeuvres, Montréal : Bibliothèque paroissiale, 1879.
 Mr. E. Picard prêtre de Saint-Sulpice, E. Sénécal, 1886.
 Colbert et le Canada, Saint-Cloud : Vve E. Belin et fils, 1889.
 M. Flavien Martineau, prêtre de St. Sulpice : esquisse biographique, Montréal : Impr. de J. Lovell, 1889.
 Cours d'archéologie : les Indes, l'Egypte, l'Assyrie, la Palestine, Montréal : [s.n.], 1890.
 Histoire du Chevalier d'Iberville, 1663-1706, Montréal : J.M. Valois, 1890.

References
 Library and Archives Canada
 Bibliothèque et Archives nationales du Québec

External links
 
 

1818 births
1891 deaths
Canadian male non-fiction writers
Canadian non-fiction writers in French
19th-century Canadian non-fiction writers
19th-century Canadian male writers
19th-century Canadian Roman Catholic priests